Garsaultia is a genus of mites in the family Acaridae.

Species
 Garsaultia testudo Oudemans, 1916

References

Acaridae